Antiguan and Barbudan Americans are Americans of full or partial Antiguan and Barbudan ancestry.

Notable people

 Anna Maria Horsford
 Jamaica Kincaid
 Z. Alexander Looby
 Patsy Moore
 Kemba Walker
 DJ Red Alert

See also
Antigua and Barbuda–United States relations
Caribbean immigration to New York City

References

 
Antigua and Barbuda diaspora
Caribbean American